Berserker is the eleventh studio album by the Swedish death metal band Amon Amarth. It was released on 3 May 2019 through Metal Blade Records and Sony Music. The album was produced by Jay Ruston and marks the first album by the band to feature drummer Jocke Wallgren, who joined the band in 2016.

Critical reception 
Exclaim! rated the album 8/10, describing the band's "sound that emphasized strong, triumphant riffage and bombastic songwriting" and stated that the album "features some of their strongest material" since Twilight of the Thunder God. Loudwire named it one of the 50 best metal albums of 2019.

Track listing

Personnel

Amon Amarth
 Olavi Mikkonen − lead guitar
 Johan Hegg − vocals
 Ted Lundström − bass
 Johan Söderberg − rhythm guitar
 Jocke Wallgren − drums

Production
Jay Ruston − producer
Michael Lord – orchestration on "Into the Dark"

Cover art 

 Brent Elliott White – cover art, interior art

Charts

References

2019 albums
Amon Amarth albums
Metal Blade Records albums